South Devon Railway may refer to:

 South Devon Railway Company - the company that built the railway from Exeter to Plymouth 
 South Devon Railway (heritage railway) - the heritage railway from Totnes to Buckfastleigh
 South Devon Railway Engineering - rolling stock engineering company based at Buckfastleigh

Other heritage railways in South Devon include:
 Paignton and Dartmouth Steam Railway

Other early railways in South Devon include:
 Buckfastleigh, Totnes and South Devon Railway
 Dartmouth and Torbay Railway
 Launceston and South Devon Railway
 Lee Moor Tramway
 Moretonhampstead and South Devon Railway
 Plymouth and Dartmoor Railway
 Plymouth, Devonport and South Western Junction Railway
 South Devon and Tavistock Railway
 Torbay and Brixham Railway